Syed Rafat Alam (born: 8 August 1950) is an Indian Judge and former Chief Justice of the High Court of Madhya Pradesh and former Chief Justice of Allahabad High Court.

Early life and education 
Alam was born in 1950. He graduated in Art with Honours from St. Columba's College, Hazaribagh in 1970 and passed LL.B. from Patna Law College, Patna. After the enrollment in 1975, he started practice in the Patna High Court on Constitutional, Civil Taxation and Education Matters.

Career
Alam served as Standing Counsel for the State of Bihar and Bihar State Electricity Board. He pleaded on behalf of Patna University and Magadh University in the High Court in his lawyer's career. He also worked as part time Lecturer in Law Faculty of College of Commerce, Arts and Science, Patna since 1983 till his elevation as Judge. In 1994 he became the Permanent Judge of the Patna High Court and transferred to Allahabad High Court in the same year. Justice Alam took over the charge of Acting Chief Justice of the Allahabad High Court for various periods. He was appointed Chief Justice of Madhya Pradesh High Court on 20 December 2009. After the retirement he became the Chairman of Uttar Pradesh Human Rights Commission.

References

1950 births
Living people
Chief Justices of the Madhya Pradesh High Court
Judges of the Patna High Court
Judges of the Allahabad High Court
20th-century Indian judges
21st-century Indian judges
20th-century Indian lawyers
21st-century Indian lawyers